Shin Soo-Jin (born October 26, 1982) is a South Korean football player who is currently a free agent.

He formerly played for Gwangju Sangmu and Busan I'Park in the K-League.

Career statistics 
As of end of 2008 season

References

Korean FA Cup match result 

1982 births
Living people
Association football defenders
South Korean footballers
Busan IPark players
Gimcheon Sangmu FC players
Ulsan Hyundai Mipo Dockyard FC players
K League 1 players
Korea National League players